Ghahreman is a surname. Notable people with the surname include:

Ahmad Ghahreman (1928–2008), Iranian botanist and professor 
Azita Ghahreman (born 1962), Iranian poet

See also
Ghahremani

Persian-language surnames